Piatykhatky can refer to

 Piatykhatky, a city in Dnipropetrovsk Oblast
 Piatykhatky, a historic neighborhood in Kharkiv